Richard King Sampson (15 May 1860 – 12 July 1927) was an English cricketer.  Sampson was a right-handed batsman who occasionally fielded as a wicket-keeper.  He was born at Lewes, Sussex.

Sampson made a single first-class appearance for Sussex against Nottinghamshire at Trent Bridge in 1886.  He was dismissed for 2 runs in Sussex's first-innings by Wilfred Flowers, while in their second-innings he scored 5 runs before becoming one of William Attewell's 9 wickets.  Nottinghamshire won by an innings and 15 runs.  This was his only major appearance for Sussex.

He died at Ringmer, Sussex on 12 July 1927.

References

External links
Richard Sampson at ESPNcricinfo
Richard Sampson at CricketArchive

1860 births
1927 deaths
People from Lewes
English cricketers
Sussex cricketers
People from Ringmer